Elections to the National Assembly of France were held in Algeria on 21 October 1945. The election was held with two colleges, citizens and non-citizens.

Results

References

Elections in Algeria
Legislative elections in France
1945 in Algeria
Algeria
Algeria
October 1945 events in Africa